Black Desert may refer to:

 a desert:
 Harrat al-Shamah, a region of the Syrian Desert
 Black Rock Desert, a semi-arid region in Nevada
 Black Desert, a desert in western Egypt

a game:
 Black Desert Online, a multiplayer online role-playing game

See also 
 Walterinnesia aegyptia, the black desert cobra